Season of Love or Seasons of Love may refer to:

Film and TV
Season of Love (TV series), a 2013 Hong Kong television series
Seasons of Love (TV series), a 2014 Filipino television drama
Seasons of Love (film), a 1999 Canadian miniseries
Season of Love (film), a 2019 Holiday-themed lesbian romantic comedy

Music
The Season of Love, album of the Contemporary Christian group 4 Him
 Seasons of Love (album), by Mad at the World
"Seasons of Love", a song from the musical Rent
"Season of Love", song by 98 Degrees
"Season of Love" (song), Mai Kuraki's twenty-sixth single, released in 2007
"Season of Love", song by Shiny Toy Guns from Season of Poison